Gantihole is a village in Udupi district, Karnataka, India.

References 

Villages in Udupi district